Inca Garcilaso de la Vega Avenue, also known by its old name, Wilson Avenue, is an avenue in Lima, Peru.

It is constituted as one of the main access roads to the historic centre of Lima and extends from north to south along 12 blocks.

History
The avenue was originally called El Sol Avenue, a name that was later changed to Wilson in homage to U.S. President Woodrow Wilson. Although during the government of General Juan Velasco Alvarado the name was changed to the more autochthonous Inca Garcilaso de la Vega, in honor of the first mestizo writer in Peru, the name Wilson continues to be used by locals to this day.

It currently has an underground overpass at the intersection with 28 de Julio Avenue, allowing traffic flow to Arequipa and República de Chile avenues, from which  originates.

Route
In its twelve-block route, the main highlights are its blocks 11, 12 and 13, which constitute the largest cluster of computer items in Lima. The area is the location of many well-known commercial galleries where software and hardware products are sold. There is a belief that this emporium is the largest producer of pirated software in the country, however, journalistic sources indicate that only 16% of the products sold are pirated.

The avenue's intersection with the Avenida España is the location of the former U.S. Embassy, today the Clínica Internacional, and of the Casa Matusita, a house known for the popular belief of being of the paranormal type. The avenue is also the location of the SUNAT Building, located near the former embassy, the Lima Civic Center, located on the 13th block, the Park of the Exhibition, among others.

References

Inca Garcilaso de la Vega